Melody and the Tyranny is an EP released by Velvet Revolver as a precursor to their album Libertad. It includes two tracks from Libertad as well as the Talking Heads cover "Psycho Killer" and a live rendition of "Do It for the Kids", a song from Velvet Revolver's debut album, Contraband. The documentary on the making of Libertad was Produced and Directed by Rocco Guarino.

The EP received a European and Australian release and was not released in North America. It was limited to just 5,000 copies.

Track listing
 "She Builds Quick Machines" (Scott Weiland, Slash, Duff McKagan, Matt Sorum, Dave Kushner)
 "Just Sixteen" (Weiland, Slash, McKagan, Sorum, Kushner)
 "Psycho Killer" (David Byrne, Chris Frantz, Tina Weymouth)
 "Making of Libertad" – 5 minute piece (video)
 "Do It for the Kids" – live (video) (Weiland, Slash, McKagan, Sorum, Kushner)

Personnel
 Scott Weiland – lead vocals
 Slash – lead guitar
 Dave Kushner – rhythm guitar
 Duff McKagan – bass, backing vocals
 Matt Sorum – drums, percussion, backing vocals

Chart

References

2007 EPs
Velvet Revolver albums
RCA Records EPs
Albums produced by Brendan O'Brien (record producer)